Coffine Gurunaru is a coffeehouse chain based in South Korea.

See also
 List of coffeehouse chains

References

External links
 

Coffee brands
South Korean brands
Coffeehouses and cafés in South Korea